Fountain House may refer to:

Buildings
 Fountain House (Saint Petersburg), a palace in Russia
 The Fountain House (Doylestown, Pennsylvania), U.S., an NRHP-listed place
 Fountain House, 7207 Ventura Avenue, Jacksonville, Florida, U.S., an NRHP-listed place in the San Jose Estates Thematic Resource Area
 William Fountain House, Garrett, Indiana, U.S., an NRHP-listed place

Other uses
 Fountain House, a 1943-founded support group that led to the Clubhouse model of psychosocial rehabilitation, some of which have that name.

See also

Fountain (disambiguation)
The Fountain (disambiguation)
The Fountain (Yadkin Valley, North Carolina), U.S., or Walnut Fountain and the Colonel Davenport House
Fountain-Bessac House, Manchester, Michigan, U.S.
Fountain Elms, a historic house in Utica, New York, U.S.
Fountain Lake Farm, Montello, Wisconsin, U.S.
Fountain Park Chautauqua, Remington, Indiana, U.S.
Fountain Plaza Apartments, Evanston, Illinois, U.S.
Fountain-Tallman Soda Works, Placerville, California, U.S.
Fountainhead (Jackson, Mississippi), U.S.